Sha Yibo (born 7 January 1991 in Qingdao, Shandong) is a Chinese footballer who currently plays as a defender for Qingdao Hainiu.

Club career
Sha was promoted to China League One club Qingdao Hailifeng first team squad in 2009. He made his senior debut on 2 May 2009, in a 2–0 away defeat against Liaoning Whowin, coming on as a substitute for Zhang Tiangang in the 81st minute. On 21 February 2010, Qingdao Hailifeng was banned from all future national matches organised by the Chinese Football Association and subsequently dissolved for match-fixing the 22 September 2007 league game against Chengdu Blades F.C. to intentionally lose 2-0. While Sha was never suspected of any wrongdoing he still became an unattached player, however he would sign a contract with Chinese Super League side Qingdao Jonoon on 12 March 2010. On 23 April 2011, he made his debut for Qingdao Jonoon in a Super League match which Qingdao lost to Guangzhou Evergrande 2–0. He came on as a substitute for Song Wenjie in the 70th minute. On 27 June 2012, he scored his first and second senior goal in the third round of 2012 Chinese FA Cup, which ensured Qingdao Jonoon beat League Two side Guizhou Zhicheng 4–0. 

At the end of the 2013 Chinese Super League campaign he would be part of the squad that was relegated. This would be followed by another relegation at the end of the 2016 China League One campaign. Throughout this, Sha would remain loyal towards the club as they re-branded themselves as Qingdao Hainiu. He would go on to play a vital part as the club won the third tier title and promotion at the end of the 2021 China League Two season. He would go on to achieve successive promotions as he helped guide the club to second in the 2022 China League One season and promotion back into the top tier.

Career statistics 
Statistics accurate as of match played 31 December 2022.

Honours

Club
Qingdao Hainiu
China League Two: 2021

References

External links
Sha Yibo at Soccerway.com

1991 births
Living people
Association football defenders
Chinese footballers
Footballers from Qingdao
Qingdao Hainiu F.C. (1990) players
Chinese Super League players
China League One players